Zhang Tingyu (October 29, 1672 – May 19, 1755) was a Han Chinese politician and historian who lived in the Qing dynasty.

Biography

Zhang Tingyu was born in Tongcheng in Anhui province. In 1700, he obtained a jinshi position in the imperial examination and shortly afterwards he was appointed to the Hanlin Academy. He subsequently rose through the ranks in the Qing civil service and served under the Kangxi, Yongzheng and Qianlong emperors. Zhang Tingyu was especially trusted by the Yongzheng Emperor, who made him one of the first members of the Grand Council, an informal state organ which would, in due course, develop into the emperor's own privy council. His colleagues included renowned figures like Maci.

Zhang was an upstanding civil service officer and highly praised for both his upright character and principled background. Having considerable skill in literature, he compiled the History of Ming in 1739. There is some confusion as to whether he or another trusted officer Longkodo was the principal announcer of the will of Kangxi. Zhang was the only official to survive the battles of succession from Kangxi to Yongzheng to Qianlong, and was trusted by all three emperors. His Manchu rival, Ortai, was an official who served Yongzheng and Qianlong. However, his relationship with the Qianlong Emperor deteriorated during his final years.

In 1749, Zhang requested for retirement, his second request in two years. In his letter, Zhang further requested the Qianlong Emperor to honor the Yongzheng Emperor's wish to allow his plaque to be placed at the Imperial Ancestral Temple. The Qianlong Emperor was displeased, but granted Zhang's request. The next day, Zhang did not visit the emperor to thank him in person, instead sending his son Ruocheng. The Qianlong Emperor was greatly angered by this, and issued an edict to rebuke Zhang. Wang Youdun, one of Zhang's students, sought clemency on Zhang's behalf, and informed Zhang of the emperor's anger. However, Zhang made the mistake of seeking an audience with the emperor even before the edict rebuking him had reached his residence. The Qianlong emperor then knew that Wang had leaked the news of his anger to Zhang. The emperor then relieved Wang of his official post (Wang had been in said position for less than a month), and Zhang of his nobility title. In the second lunar month of 1750, Zhang again requested to return to his hometown. As the emperor's eldest son Yonghuang had just died, the emperor was again incensed. He then sent Zhang a list of past officials who had their plaques enshrined in imperial ancestral temples, and ordered Zhang to reflect on whether he was worthy of the honour. Zhang then requested the emperor to revoke the honor and to punish him; the Qianlong emperor agreed to the revocation, but did not punish Zhang further. In the seventh lunar month of the same year, Zhang Ruocheng's father-in-law Zhu Quan was implicated in a case, which then implicated Zhang Tingyu. The emperor then decided to punish Zhang by revoking all rewards which had been bestowed upon Zhang by himself, his father and grandfather.

Zhang died of illness in 1755, and was granted a plaque at the Imperial Ancestral Temple according to the wishes of the Yongzheng Emperor and the Qianlong Emperor, who had decided to reverse the revocation decision. He was the only Han Chinese official during the Qing Dynasty to be bestowed such a posthumous honor.

References 

 
 Luo, Ming. "Zhang Tingyu". Encyclopedia of China, 1st ed.
 Draft History of Qing, volume 288.

See also
Twenty-Four Histories

1672 births
1755 deaths
18th-century Chinese historians
Politicians from Anqing
Qing dynasty historians
Qing dynasty politicians from Anhui
Grand Councillors of the Qing dynasty
Grand Secretaries of the Qing dynasty
Assistant Grand Secretaries
Historians from Anhui
Qing dynasty politicians